Brad Lambert may refer to:

 Brad Lambert (American football), American college football coach
 Brad Lambert (ice hockey), Finnish ice hockey forward